Hunter Mutual was a credit union based in and serving the Upper Hunter region of New South Wales, Australia. It was established in 1968 as the Upper Hunter Local Government Employee's Credit Union. In 1971, it changed its name to the Upper Hunter Credit Union in 1971, and following a restructure of its operations in 2004, it took on the name Hunter Mutual. During the 1990s, when many major banks closed branches in small country towns, Hunter Mutual set up new branches areas within the Upper Hunter where this occurred.

Merger
In July 2009, a proposed merger between Hunter Mutual and the New England Credit Union was announced.

During December 2009, each credit union held their annual general meeting, with a majority of members (96% of Hunter Mutual members, 93% of NECU members) voting to approve the merger. The merger took place on January 1, 2010, with Hunter Mutual members becoming members of New England Credit Union, with the two computer systems to be merged in March, followed by the introduction of NECU's product range and fee structure. The merged entity has retained all locations, and Hunter Mutual CEO Col Sales has joined the executive management team. The combined company is the largest inland credit union in Australia.

The plan was that the New England and Orana Credit Union arms of NECU were to be re-branded as New England Mutual and Orana Mutual, mimicking the Hunter Mutual name. All three also had the common name of the Community Mutual Group.

Community Mutual Group later rebranded to Regional Australia Bank.

Logos

References

External links
Hunter Mutual

Credit unions of Australia
Banks established in 1968
Banks disestablished in 2010
1968 establishments in Australia